Congrogadinae is a subfamily of ray-finned fishes, one of four subfamilies that make up the family Pseudochromidae, these elongated fish are commonly called eel-blennies.

Characteristics
The species in the subfamily Congrogadidae have elongated rather eel-like bodies which are covered in with small cycloid scales. Their dorsal fin normally has a single robust spine and 32–79 rays while the anal fin lacks any spines and has 26–66 rays. The dorsal and anal fins are long and the pelvic fin is sometimes present but in more than half the species it is absent. The caudal fin is joined to the long dorsal and anal fins in a small number of species but is separated in all the others. They have a protractable mouth and there is a rear facing spine on the opercle. They have between one and three complete or partial lateral lines. There are no teeth on the palatine and they may or may not be present on the vomerine bone.

They lay eggs which are covered in hooks, some of which may develop into filaments. The eggs are clumped together in an egg mass the hooks on the eggs' surfaces interlocking with each other, which is most likely guarded by the male.

Distribution and habitat 
They are found in the Indo-Pacific region. There is one species which lives within sponges which is found in the Gulf of Carpentaria. The subfamily is thought to have arisen in the proto Indian Ocean before Gondwanaland broke up and dispersed into the western Pacific Ocean.

Genera
The following genera are included within the Congrogadinae:

 Blennodesmus Günther, 1872
 Congrogadus Günther, 1862
 Halidesmus Günther, 1872
 Halimuraena J.L.B. Smith, 1952
 Halimuraenoides Maugé & Bardach, 1985
 Haliophis Rüppell, 1829
 Natalichthys Winterbottom, 1980
 Rusichthys Winterbottom, 1979

References

 
Pseudochromidae
Taxa named by Albert Günther